The Mercury Seven were the group of seven astronauts selected to fly spacecraft for Project Mercury. They are also referred to as the Original Seven and Astronaut Group 1. Their names were publicly announced by NASA on April 9, 1959; these seven original American astronauts were Scott Carpenter, Gordon Cooper, John Glenn, Gus Grissom, Wally Schirra, Alan Shepard, and Deke Slayton. The Mercury Seven created a new profession in the United States, and established the image of the American astronaut for decades to come.

All of the Mercury Seven eventually flew in space. They piloted the six spaceflights of the Mercury program that had an astronaut on board from May 1961 to May 1963, and members of the group flew on all of the NASA human spaceflight programs of the 20th centuryMercury, Gemini, Apollo, and the Space Shuttle.

Shepard became the first American to enter space in 1961, and later walked on the Moon on Apollo 14 in 1971. Grissom flew the first crewed Gemini mission in 1965, but died in 1967 in the Apollo 1 fire; the others all survived past retirement from service. Schirra flew Apollo 7 in 1968, the first crewed Apollo mission, in Grissom's place. Slayton, grounded with an atrial fibrillation, ultimately flew on the Apollo–Soyuz Test Project in 1975. He was the last living member of the Mercury Seven when he died in 2016 at age 95.

Background 
The launch of the Sputnik 1 satellite by the Soviet Union on October 4, 1957, started a Cold War technological and ideological competition with the United States known as the Space Race. The demonstration of American technological inferiority came as a profound shock to the American public. The Soviets followed up with Sputnik 2, which carried Laika, a Soviet space dog. American intelligence analysts assessed that the Soviets planned to put a man into orbit, which caused the United States Air Force (USAF) and the National Advisory Committee for Aeronautics (NACA) to strengthen their efforts to achieve that goal.

The USAF launched a spaceflight project called Man in Space Soonest (MISS), for which it obtained approval from the Joint Chiefs of Staff, and requested $133 million in funding. This generated conflict with the two agencies that should have been supporting it, NACA and the Advanced Research Projects Agency (ARPA). The core of the problem was the USAF's inability to articulate a clear military purpose for MISS.

Meanwhile, in response to the Sputnik crisis, the President of the United States, Dwight D. Eisenhower, decided to create a new civilian agency, the National Aeronautics and Space Administration (NASA), which would absorb NACA and be responsible for the overall direction of the American space program. In September 1958, the USAF agreed to transfer responsibility for MISS to NASA, which was established on October 1, 1958. On November 5, the Space Task Group (STG) was established at the NASA Langley Research Center in Hampton, Virginia, with Robert R. Gilruth as its director. On November 26, 1958, NASA Administrator T. Keith Glennan and his deputy, Hugh Dryden, adopted a suggestion by Abe Silverstein, the director of Space Flight Development at STG, that the human spaceflight project be called Project Mercury. The name was publicly announced by Glennan on December 17, 1958, the 55th anniversary of the Wright Brothers' first flight. The objective of Project Mercury was to launch a man into Earth orbit, return him safely to the Earth, and evaluate his capabilities in space.

Selection criteria 
The STG had to decide on a name for the people who would fly into space. A brainstorming session was held on December 1, 1958. By analogy with "aeronaut" (air traveler), someone came up with the term "astronaut", which meant "star traveler", although Project Mercury's ambitions were far more limited. They thought that they had coined a new word, but the term had been used in science fiction since the 1920s. A three-man panel consisting of Charles J. Donlan, Warren J. North and Allen O. Gamble drew up a civil service job specification for astronauts. The panel proposed that astronauts be in civil service grades 12 to 15, depending on qualifications and experience, with an annual salary of $8,330 to $12,770 (equivalent to $ to $ in ). It described the duties of an astronaut:

Although the panel considered that many people might possess the required skills – aircraft pilots, submariners, deep sea divers and mountain climbers were all considered likely prospects – it decided that they could be best met by military test pilots.  Accepting only military test pilots would simplify the selection process, and would also satisfy security requirements, as the role would almost certainly involve the handling of classified information. The decision to restrict selection to military test pilots was taken by Glennan, Dryden and Gilruth in the last week of December 1958, but the irony of using military test pilots in a civilian program was not overlooked, and in view of the President's express preference for a space program outside the military, Glennan thought it best to run the decision past Eisenhower. A meeting was arranged with the President, who was convinced by the arguments.

The panel also drew up selection criteria. Astronauts had to be:
 Less than  40 years old;
 In excellent physical condition;
 With a bachelor's degree or equivalent;
 A graduate of test pilot school;
 With a minimum of 1,500 hours total flying time; and
 A qualified jet pilot.

The height limit was a function of the design of the Mercury spacecraft, which could not accommodate someone taller. It was still uncertain as to whether piloting in the conventional sense would ever be possible in a spacecraft, but from the beginning the spacecraft design provided for some degree of manual control.

Selection process 

The first step in the selection process was to obtain the service records of test pilot school graduates from the United States Department of Defense. All services agreed to cooperate fully, and handed over their records. There were 508 military test pilots in total, of whom 225 were Air Force, 225 Navy, 23 Marine Corps and 35 Army. Donlan, North, Gamble and psychologist Robert B. Voas then went through the records in January 1959, and identified 110 pilots – five Marines, 47 from the Navy, and 58 from the Air Force – who met the rest of the minimum standards. The 110 were then split into three groups, with the most promising in the first group.

Sixty-nine candidates were brought to the Pentagon in Washington, DC, in two groups. The first group of 35 assembled there on February 2, 1959. The Navy and Marine Corps officers were welcomed by the Chief of Naval Operations, Admiral Arleigh Burke, while the Air Force officers were addressed by the Chief of Staff of the United States Air Force, General Thomas D. White. Both pledged their support to the space program, and promised that the careers of volunteers would not be adversely affected. NASA officials then briefed the candidates on Project Mercury. The officials conceded that it would be a hazardous undertaking, but emphasized that it was of great national importance.

The candidates were given three briefings by NASA officials. The first was about NASA and Project Mercury; the second concerned the role of the pilot in the project; and the third was about the proposed astronaut training syllabus. In the afternoon candidates had short individual meetings with the NASA selection committee. It was emphasized that participation was entirely voluntary, that candidates were free to decline, and that there would be no career repercussions if they did so. Several candidates declined at this point.

The rest reported to NASA Headquarters in Washington, DC, the following day for further screening. Voas gave them a series of standardized tests: the Miller Analogies Test to measure IQ; the Minnesota Engineering Analogies Test to measure engineering aptitude; and the Doppelt Mathematical Reasoning Test to measure mathematical aptitude. Donlan, North and Gamble conducted interviews in which they asked technical questions, and queried candidates about their motivations for applying to the program. Candidates were evaluated by two USAF psychiatrists, George E. Ruff and Edwin Z. Levy. A USAF flight surgeon, William S. Augerson, went over the candidates' medical records. Some were found to be over the height limit, and were eliminated at this juncture.

The process was repeated with a second group of 34 candidates a week later. Of the 69, six were found to be over the height limit, 15 were eliminated for other reasons, and 16 declined. This left NASA with 32 candidates: 15 from the Navy, 15 from the Air Force and two from the Marine Corps. Since this was more than expected, NASA decided not to bother with the remaining 41 candidates, as 32 candidates seemed a more than adequate number from which to select 12 astronauts as planned. The degree of interest also indicated that far fewer would drop out during training than anticipated, which would result in training astronauts who would not be required to fly Project Mercury missions. It was therefore decided to cut the number of astronauts selected to just six.

Then came a grueling series of physical and psychological tests at the Lovelace Clinic and the Wright Aerospace Medical Laboratory from January to March, under the direction of Albert H. Schwichtenberg, a retired USAF brigadier general. The tests included spending hours on treadmills and tilt tables, submerging their feet in ice water, three doses of castor oil, and five enemas. Only one candidate, Jim Lovell, was eliminated on medical grounds at this stage, a diagnosis that was later found to be in error; thirteen others were recommended with reservations. Gilruth found himself unable to select only six from the remaining eighteen, and ultimately seven were chosen.

Despite their rejection from the first group of astronauts, many of the 25 finalists who were passed over still had successful military careers. Three eventually became astronauts: Pete Conrad and Jim Lovell, who were selected with the next group in 1962; and Edward Givens, who was selected with the fifth group in 1966. Others achieved high rank: Lawrence Heyworth Jr. became a rear admiral, Robert B. Baldwin and William P. Lawrence became vice admirals, and Thomas B. Hayward became an admiral. He commanded the Seventh Fleet and the Pacific Fleet, and was Chief of Naval Operations. Three of the finalists later died in aircraft accidents: Halvor M. Ekeren, Jr., on April 8, 1959, Jack B. Mayo on January 11, 1961, and Hal R. Crandall on July 24, 1963. Finalist Robert G. Bell died in the May 16, 1965 explosion of multiple aircraft at Bien Hoa Air Base, Vietnam.

Eligibility 
The seven original American astronauts were Navy Lieutenant Scott Carpenter, Air Force Captain Gordon Cooper, Marine Lieutenant Colonel John Glenn, Air Force Captain Gus Grissom, Navy Lieutenant Commander Wally Schirra, Navy Lieutenant Commander Alan Shepard, and Air Force Captain Deke Slayton.

All were male and white. Women were not yet accepted into the military test pilot schools, and the first African American to graduate from the USAF Experimental Test Pilot School, John L. Whitehead Jr., did so only in January 1958, and was not one of the finalists. Yet the Mercury Seven were similar beyond what was a simple result of the selection criteria. Four were their fathers' namesakes. All were the eldest or only sons in their families. All were born in the United States, and were raised in small towns. All were married with children, and all were Protestants.

Their ages at the time of selection ranged from 32 (Cooper) to 37 (Glenn). Both had to watch their weight carefully while they were in the space program. IQs ranged from 135 to 147.

All seven had attended post-secondary institutions in the 1940s. Of the five astronauts who had completed undergraduate degrees before being selected, two (Shepard and Schirra) were graduates of the United States Naval Academy at Annapolis, Maryland, in 1944 and 1945, respectively. Following a decade of intermittent studies, Cooper completed his bachelor's degree in aerospace engineering at the Air Force Institute of Technology (AFIT) in 1956. Grissom earned a bachelor's degree in mechanical engineering from Purdue University in 1950, and a second bachelor's degree, in aeromechanics, from the AFIT in 1956. Slayton graduated from the University of Minnesota with a bachelor's degree in aeronautical engineering in 1949. Average flying hours were 3,500, of which 1,700 was in jets. Most were fighter pilots except Carpenter, who flew multi-engine patrol planes for most of his career.

Glenn and Carpenter did not meet all of their schools' degree requirements; Glenn had not completed his senior year in residence or his final proficiency exam, and Carpenter had not finished his final course in heat transfer. Both were admitted on the basis of professional equivalency, and were ultimately awarded their bachelor's degrees after their 1962 space flights—Glenn in engineering from Muskingum College and Carpenter in aeronautical engineering from the University of Colorado at Boulder.

Despite the extensive physical examinations, Slayton had an undiagnosed atrial fibrillation, which resulted in his grounding two months prior to what would have been his first space flight, and the second orbital mission.

NASA introduction 
NASA introduced the astronauts in Washington, DC, on April 9, 1959. Although the agency viewed Project Mercury's purpose as an experiment to determine whether humans could survive space travel, the seven men immediately became national heroes and were compared by Time magazine to "Columbus, Magellan, Daniel Boone, and the Wright brothers". Two hundred reporters overflowed the room used for the announcement and alarmed the astronauts, who were unused to such a large audience.

Because they wore civilian clothes, the audience did not see them as military test pilots but "mature, middle-class Americans, average in height and visage, family men all". To the astronauts' surprise, the reporters asked questions about their personal lives instead of their war records or flight experience, or details about Project Mercury. After Glenn responded by speaking eloquently "on God, country, and family", the others followed his example, and were applauded by the reporters.

Test pilots accepted that their jobs were dangerous; during Glenn's three years serving as one for the Navy, 12 had died. When asked about how their families thought about their taking on such a dangerous job, most of the seven were surprised, as they had never considered this before. Glenn replied that he "didn't think that any of us could really go on with something like this if we didn't have pretty good backing at home. My wife's attitude towards this has been the same as it has been all along through my flying. If it is what I want to do, she is behind it, and the kids are too, one hundred percent." Carpenter received even more applause when he noted that he was at sea when NASA had phoned to inform him that he had been chosen, and his wife Rene had accepted on his behalf.

Cooper's wife Trudy had left him in January 1959 after he had an affair with another officer's wife, and had moved to San Diego. During the selection interviews, he had been asked about his domestic relationship, and had lied, saying that he and Trudy had a good, stable marriage. Aware that NASA wanted to project an image of its astronauts as loving family men, and that his story would not stand up to scrutiny, he drove down to San Diego to see Trudy at the first opportunity. Lured by the prospect of a great adventure for herself and her daughters, she agreed to go along with the charade and pretend that they were a happily married couple.

Group members

Influence 

The Mercury spacecraft was less finished than the astronauts' previous vehicles. After watching an Atlas rocket explode during launch on May 18, 1959, they publicly joked "I'm glad they got that out of the way"typical gallows humor that test pilots used to cope with dangerbut privately calculated that one of the seven would die during Project Mercury. The astronauts participated in the project's design and planning, dividing the work between them. Carpenter had training in airborne electronics and celestial navigation, so he assumed responsibility for the spacecraft's communications and navigation systems. Grissom had a degree in mechanical engineering, so he became responsible for the attitude control systems. Glenn had experience flying many types of aircraft, so he oversaw the cockpit layout. Schirra drew responsibility for the life support systems and the pressure suits. Drawing on his experience as a Naval officer, Shepard looked after the tracking network and liaised with the Navy on recovery operations. Cooper and Slayton were Air Force officers with engineering backgrounds, so they dealt with the Redstone Arsenal and Convair, who built the Redstone and Atlas boosters used by Project Mercury. The astronauts affected the design of the Mercury spacecraft in significant ways, insisting that a window be installed, and pressing for a greater degree of astronaut autonomy in flying the spacecraft.

The astronauts remained on active duty as military officers, and were paid according to their rank. To supplement their travel, they were provided a $9 per diem for day trips, and a $12 per diem for overnight trips, which did not cover the cost of hotels and restaurant meals. As a result, astronauts avoided spending money while traveling, as they were personally responsible for costs over their allotted per diem.  An important component of their income was monthly flight pay, which ranged from $190 to $245 (equivalent to $ to $ in ).

The astronauts traveled to frequent meetings around the country on commercial flights, which forced them to earn their flight pay on weekends. Grissom and Slayton regularly drove to Langley Air Force Base, and attempted to fly the required four hours a month, but had to compete for T-33 aircraft with colonels and generals. Cooper traveled to McGhee Tyson Air National Guard Base in Tennessee, where a friend let him fly higher-performance F-104B jets. This came up when Cooper had lunch with William Hines, a reporter for The Washington Star, and was duly reported in the paper. Cooper then discussed the issue with Congressman James G. Fulton. The matter was taken up by the House Committee on Science and Astronautics. Within weeks the astronauts were given priority access to USAF T-33s, F-102s and F-106s at Langley. In 1962, NASA acquired a fleet of T-38s for their use.

After General Motors executive Ed Cole presented Shepard with a brand-new Chevrolet Corvette, Jim Rathmann, a race car driver who won the Indianapolis 500 in 1960 and who was a Chevrolet dealer in Melbourne, Florida, convinced Cole to turn this into an ongoing marketing campaign. Henceforth, astronauts were able to lease new Corvettes for a dollar a year. All of the Mercury Seven but Glenn took up the offer. Cooper, Grissom and Shepard were soon racing their Corvettes around Cape Canaveral, with the military and local police ignoring their exploits. From a marketing perspective, it was very successful, and helped the highly priced Corvette become established as a desirable brand.

The Mercury astronauts established the style and appearance of astronauts. "I soon learned", Gene Kranz later recalled, "if you saw someone wearing a short-sleeved Ban-Lon shirt and aviator sunglasses, you were looking at an astronaut." While busy with the intense training for their flights, they also drank and partied. Some had affairs with the female groupies that flocked around them. NASA actively sought to protect the astronauts and the agency from negative publicity and maintain an image of "clean-cut, all-American boy[s]." The seven Mercury astronauts agreed to share equally any proceeds from interviews regardless of who flew first.

They were forbidden from being compensated for radio or television appearances, or endorsing commercial products, but were allowed to sell their personal stories. In August 1959, they hired an agent, C. Leo DeOrsey, and he negotiated an exclusive contract with Life magazine on behalf of the astronauts for $500,000 in exchange for exclusive access to their private lives, homes, and families. The money was used as life insurance. Between August, 1959, and May 15, 1963, they each received $71,428.71. Their official spokesman from 1959 to 1963 was NASA's public affairs officer, USAF Lieutenant Colonel John "Shorty" Powers, who as a result became known in the press as the "eighth astronaut".

As additional groups of astronauts were selected in the 1960s, the Mercury Seven remained in control of management decisions. The Astronaut Office, which was headed by Shepard, was one of three divisions in the Directorate of Flight Crew Operations, which was headed by Slayton. Since twenty-six of the first thirty astronauts were military personnel, the Astronaut Office had a military character, although few of the astronauts wore their uniforms even as much as once a year. There was a bi-weekly military-style pilots' meeting at which activities planned for the upcoming two weeks would be discussed. A "captain's mast" was held afterwards to adjudicate disputes.

Shepard ran the Astronaut Office on a "rank has its privileges" basis. The Mercury and 1962 astronauts had their own allocated parking spaces outside Building 4 at Johnson Space Center, while astronauts from later groups had to compete for the remaining spaces allotted to astronauts. While Shepard prohibited junior astronauts from receiving gifts and consulting or teaching part-time, he remained vice president and part owner of the Baytown National Bank in Houston, and devoted much of his time to it.

Training was always ungraded; the Mercury astronauts had nothing to gain and much to lose from being objectively compared to the newer classes, as it could threaten their privileged status, managerial control, and priority for flight assignments. The astronaut's attendance at their training events was voluntary. The character of the Astronaut Office would only change after Mercury astronauts retired in the 1970s, and control passed to George Abbey.

The Mercury Seven wrote first-hand accounts of their selection and preparation for the Mercury missions in the 1962 book We Seven. In 1979 Tom Wolfe published a less sanitized version of their story in The Right Stuff. Wolfe's book was the basis for the 1983 film of the same name directed by Philip Kaufman, and the 2020 TV series of the same name.

Together with Betty Grissom, Gus Grissom's widow, in 1984 the Mercury astronauts founded the Mercury Seven Foundation, which raises money to provide college scholarships to science and engineering students. It was renamed the Astronaut Scholarship Foundation in 1995. Shepard was elected its first president and chairman, positions which he held until October 1997, when he was succeeded by Jim Lovell. 

Glenn became the first American in orbit in 1962. He was the last living member of the Mercury Seven when he died in 2016 at the age of 95.

Awards and honors 
The Mercury 7 group won the Society of Experimental Test Pilots' Iven C. Kincheloe Award in 1963. President John F. Kennedy presented the astronaut group the 1962 Collier Trophy at the White House "for pioneering manned space flight in the United States". The Mercury 7 monument at Launch Complex 14, where the four Mercury-Atlas launches took place, was dedicated on November 10, 1964. A time capsule containing reports, photographs and a movie is buried beneath the monument, to be opened in 2464.

See also
 Mercury 13

Notes

References 

 
 
 
 
 
 
 
 
 
 
 
 
 
 
 
 
 
 
 
 
 
 

 
NASA astronauts
Project Mercury
American astronauts
NASA Astronaut Corps